Ghar Tehsil is a subdivision located in Mohmand District, Khyber Pakhtunkhwa, Pakistan. It's about 70km from Peshawar. The population is 35,290 according to the 2017 census.

The region is divided into two parts: Upper Prang Ghar, where people belong to Umar Khel (a sub tribe of Utmankhel), and Lower Prang Ghar, where people belong to Shahdad Kor, Denikhel, and Miagan. There are three small dams which are used for agricultural purposes and fishing. The Mohmand Dam is also located in Prang Ghar. The Swat River separates Prang Ghar from other tehsils of the Mohmand District. There are many famous shrines of Sufi saints located in the green hills of Upper Prang Ghar, such as Yousaf Baba, and Isa Baba in Ziarat Lower Prang Ghar. Most of the people are former overseas workers or government servants.

Geography 
The land is mostly hilly and sandy, which is very suitable for the agricultural production of tomatoes and onions. Most of the land is barani and some is irrigated through tubewells or dams. The Kohi Hindukush mountain range starts from Prang Ghar and extends up to Dir and Chitral. The hills are rich in minerals such as nephrite, chromite, and marble.

Education 
There is one higher secondary school and three high schools for both boys and girls.

Villages 
There are three village and one NC.

Additional information 
Among the completed schemes in Prang Ghar is the Moto Shah Dam. With a 25 square kilometer catchment area, the dam has the potential to bring about an agricultural revolution in the mountainous tribal area.

In a briefing to Mohmand Agency political agent Waqar Ali, project engineer Tariq Khan said the dam was completed over a period of two years at a cost of Rs 191 million. He said that irrigation channels measuring about 70 kilometers have been created for 550-600 acres of land thanks to the dam. In addition to Moto Shah, the Khursheed Dam has also been constructed in the same tehsil of the Mohmand Agency. In addition to its practical use, the dam has caused water levels to rise, adding greenery to the mountainous landscape.

Local malik Dost Muhammad said that Prang Ghar was previously famous for poppy cultivation because rainwater was the only source of irrigation. During the rainy season, locals had little choice but to cultivate poppy as it was an easy crop to grow. However, the dam has increased their options and farmers are now able to grow off-season crops and vegetables on their land. Muhammad urged the government to carry out more such development schemes to ensure further progress in the area.

See also 
 List of tehsils of Khyber Pakhtunkhwa

References

External links 

 Amidst the mayhem: Prang Ghar, a beacon of peace

Tehsils of Khyber Pakhtunkhwa
Populated places in Mohmand District